Greenbrier or Green Brier may refer to:

 Smilax, a plant genus commonly called greenbrier

Places in the United States
 Greenbrier, Alabama
 Greenbrier, Arkansas 
 Green Brier, Illinois
 Greenbrier, Indiana (disambiguation)
 Greenbrier, Lexington, Kentucky
 Greenbrier, Missouri
 Greenbrier, Tennessee
 Greenbrier, Virginia
 Greenbrier (Great Smoky Mountains), a valley Tennessee
 Greenbrier County, West Virginia
 The Greenbrier, a resort in White Sulphur Springs, West Virginia
 a nuclear bunker under Project Greek Island

Streams
 Greenbrier River, in West Virginia, U.S.
 Greenbrier Creek (Rocky River tributary), in North Carolina, U.S.

Other uses
 Greenbrier (film), the working title of El Camino: A Breaking Bad Movie
 Greenbrier Classic, a PGA golf tournament
 The Greenbrier Companies, an American manufacturing corporation
 Greenbrier High School (disambiguation)
 Chevrolet Greenbrier, the name of two vehicles

See also
 Brier (disambiguation)
 Greenbriar (disambiguation)